Schuettea scalaripinnis is a species of marine ray-finned fish in the family Monodactylidae, the moonyfishes. Its common names include eastern pomfred, or ladder-finned pomfret.

A small schooling species up to 24 cm long, found in coastal areas off southern New South Wales to central Queensland. Often seen in large schools off sheltered rocky ledges.

External links

References

Monodactylidae
Fish of Australia
Fish described in 1866